Hedgerow Theatre is a theatre company based in Rose Valley, Pennsylvania, near Philadelphia, founded in 1923. It was "for many years the only true U. S. professional repertory theater." The building is a contributing structure in the Rose Valley Historic District listed on the National Register of Historic Places.

History

Hedgerow was founded in 1923 by New York-based director and actor Jasper Deeter in Rose Valley, less than 3 miles from Media and Swarthmore. The theatre itself, originally a grist-mill built in 1840, seats 144 spectators after a reconstruction designed by architect Will Price. Other sources note, however, that the Theatre building was "erected in 1807 as a snuff mill and later rebuilt as a handweaving mill." It is a contributing structure in the Rose Valley Historic District. Hedgerow's green room showcases a staircase and table designed by Wharton Esherick, an acclaimed American craftsman and a one-time set designer for Hedgerow. Located a half mile from the theatre is Hedgerow House, used as housing for the residential company members as well as a rehearsal space, school, and office, accompanied by the costume and prop shops.

The Pennsylvania Guide, compiled by the Writers' Program of the Works Progress Administration in 1940, described the founding of the Theatre by Deeter and its early operations:

During its long history, Hedgerow has helped to spawn other popular theatre companies, such as People's Light and Theatre Company. Hedgerow has been the site of many play debuts and has received recognition by producing the plays of George Bernard Shaw, Eugene O'Neill, and Seán O'Casey. Its actors have included H. Foley, Richard Basehart, Ann Harding, Keanu Reeves, Stephen Lang, and Austin Pendleton.

From 1990 to 2013, Hedgerow was under the artistic direction of Penelope Reed, who encouraged the educational growth of the company as well as an atmosphere of collaboration. Currently, the company is led by Mrs. Reed's son, Jared Reed.

The company stages upwards of two dozen productions a year and relies on the dedication of its company members, volunteers, and surrounding community. A Mainstage season tends to include new plays, farces, Shakespeare, mysteries, and at Christmastime, A Christmas Carol. The Horizons series runs in repertory with the Mainstage season and frequently showcases new plays, often featuring the younger company members. The Mainstage season has been divided into two different series. The theatre has started to be operated under a Small Professional Theatre contract, featuring more equity artists in what will be known as the Signature series, while the entire company and emerging artists appear in the Heritage series.

Hedgerow focuses much dedication on school tours as well as outreach programs to underserved audiences. The Children's Theatre productions also serve as an educational outlet, featuring actors from ages three and up, originally formed by Rose Schulman. It also offers fellowships to recent college graduates pursuing professional and practical experience. Fellows typically stay with the company for a year in residence at Hedgerow House and gain experience in acting, stage management, design, administration, and development.

Hedgerow was awarded the Best New Play 2005 Barrymore Award for The Lives of Bosie by John Wolfson.

References

Further reading
Jasper Deeter.  The Eugene O'Neill Review. Retrieved 2007-10-2.
Wharton Esherick.  Wharton Esherick Master Home Page. Retrieved 2007-10-2.
Theatre Alliance of Greater Philadelphia. Retrieved 2007-10-2.
Henry Miller, "Jasper Deeter and the Hedgerow Theater," Remember To Remember (New Directions, 1947) p. 109-125.
Witham, Barry (2013). A Sustainable Theatre: Jasper Deeter at Hedgerow. Palgrave Macmillan. ISBN 978-0230341456.

External links
 

Theatres in Pennsylvania
Theatre companies in Pennsylvania
Buildings and structures in Delaware County, Pennsylvania
Tourist attractions in Delaware County, Pennsylvania
Theatres on the National Register of Historic Places in Pennsylvania
Buildings and structures on the National Register of Historic Places in Pennsylvania